Pedro Miguel Carvalho Deus Correia (born 6 August 1990), known as Ró-Ró, is a professional footballer who plays for Al Sadd SC and the Qatar national team as a right-back or a central defender.

Having played lower-league football in Portugal, he appeared for Al Ahli and Al Sadd in the Qatar Stars League after arriving in the country in January 2011. He won several honours with the latter, including three league titles.

Born in Portugal, Ró-Ró represented Cape Verde and Qatar at under-21 and senior levels, respectively. He was part of the squads at the 2019 Asian Cup, 2019 Copa América, 2021 Gold Cup and 2022 World Cup, winning the first of those tournaments.

Club career
Born in Algueirão–Mem Martins, Sintra, Portugal of Cape Verdean descent, Ró-Ró received his nickname in tribute to his idols, the Brazilian internationals Ronaldo and Romário. He played for several clubs as a youth, including Benfica where he spent nearly six seasons, and made his senior debut with Farense in the fourth division in 2009; he switched the following season to another team in that tier, Aljustrelense.

In January 2011, Ró-Ró left his country of birth and signed for Al Ahli in Qatar. He scored his first goal against Al Kharaitiyat on 7 January 2012, but in a 2–4 loss.

Ró-Ró appeared in only six matches in his first full season, and the Doha-based side was also relegated from the Stars League. He joined Al Sadd of the same league in 2016 and, upon his arrival, revealed his interest in playing for the Qatar national team. He netted for the first time in the league for the Jesualdo Ferreira-led squad on 12 December of that year, contributing to an 8–0 home demolition of Umm Salal.

At the 2019 FIFA Club World Cup on home soil, Ró-Ró scored in extra time as Al Sadd won 3–1 against New Caledonia's Hienghène Sport in the first round. Playing in an attacking formation under former teammate Xavi, he was a league winner again in 2020–21, in addition to winning two national cups.

International career

Ró-Ró appeared for the Cape Verde national under-21 team on 24 March 2009, playing entirely in a 2–0 friendly away loss to Portugal. He also represented the nation at the 2009 Lusofonia Games tournament, where his team won the gold medal.

On 29 March 2016, Ró-Ró made his debut for Qatar, starting in a 2–0 away loss to China for the 2018 FIFA World Cup qualifiers. On 23 December 2017, he scored his first goal to conclude a 4–0 victory over Yemen at the 23rd Arabian Gulf Cup; the side exited in the group stage in Kuwait. He played all the matches at the 2019 AFC Asian Cup, as the tournament ended in triumph in the United Arab Emirates.

Ró-Ró was also called up for the country's guest appearances at the 2019 Copa América and the 2021 CONCACAF Gold Cup, reaching the semi-finals of the latter. At the inaugural FIFA Arab Cup, in which Qatar came third on home turf that December, his campaign ended with a first-half injury against Oman in the second group game.

Coach Félix Sánchez called up Ró-Ró for Qatar's hosting of the 2022 FIFA World Cup. He made three starts for the hosts, who finished bottom of their group.

International goals
 (Qatar score listed first, score column indicates score after each Ró-Ró goal)

Honours
Al Ahli
Qatari Second Division: 2012–13

Al Sadd
Qatar Stars League: 2018–19, 2020–21, 2021–22
Qatar Cup: 2017, 2020, 2021
Emir of Qatar Cup: 2017, 2020, 2021
Sheikh Jassim Cup: 2017, 2019
Qatari Stars Cup: 2019–20

Cape Verde
Lusofonia Games: 2009

Qatar
AFC Asian Cup: 2019

References

External links

QSL profile

1990 births
Living people
People from Sintra
Citizens of Cape Verde through descent
Qatari people of Cape Verdean descent
Portuguese emigrants to Qatar
Naturalised citizens of Qatar
Portuguese sportspeople of Cape Verdean descent
Black Portuguese sportspeople
Sportspeople from Lisbon District
Portuguese footballers
Cape Verdean footballers
Qatari footballers
Association football defenders
S.C. Farense players
Qatar Stars League players
Qatari Second Division players
Al Ahli SC (Doha) players
Al Sadd SC players
Cape Verde under-21 international footballers
Qatar international footballers
2019 AFC Asian Cup players
2019 Copa América players
2021 CONCACAF Gold Cup players
2022 FIFA World Cup players
AFC Asian Cup-winning players
Portuguese expatriate footballers
Cape Verdean expatriate footballers
Expatriate footballers in Qatar
Portuguese expatriate sportspeople in Qatar
Cape Verdean expatriate sportspeople in Qatar